The Great River Shakespeare Festival (GRSF) is a professional equity theatre company in Winona, Minnesota, a Mississippi River town in the southeastern part of the state. Starting in 2004, it has produced several simultaneous performances each summer, held at the Winona State University Performing Arts Center, with annual audiences of over 10,000. Its 16th season ends August 4, 2019.

The festival offers educational opportunities, especially for youth, including an apprentice/intern production. It features many art, music, and other events, such as an annual sonnet contest with entries from around the world.

Professional company productions 
2004 (debut year): The Winter's Tale and A Midsummer Night's Dream
2005: Richard III and Much Ado About Nothing
2006: Romeo and Juliet and Twelfth Night
2007: Macbeth and As You Like It
2008: The Merchant of Venice and The Taming of the Shrew
2009: The Tempest and Love's Labours Lost
2010: The Comedy of Errors, Othello, and The Daily News
2011: Henry IV, Part One, A Midsummer Night's Dream and The Fantasticks
2012: The Two Gentlemen of Verona, King Lear, The Complete Works of William Shakespeare (abridged)2013: Twelfth Night, or What You Will, King Henry V2014: The Merry Wives of Windsor, Hamlet, Rosencrantz & Guildenstern are Dead2015: Romeo & Juliet, Much Ado About Nothing, The Glass Menagerie2016: As You Like It, Julius Caesar, Georama2017: The Comedy of Errors, Richard III, Shipwrecked! An Entertainment: The Amazing Adventures of Louis de Rougemont, "An Illiad"
2018: All's Well That Ends Well, A Midsummer Night's Dream, Shakespeare in Love, Venus in Fur2019: Macbeth, Cymbeline, The Servant of Two Masters adapted by Beth Gardiner, No Child... by Nilaja Sun, White Rabbit, Red Rabbit2021: The Tempest, Great Expectations adapted by Gale Childs Daly, Every Brilliant Thing by Duncan Macmillan and Jonny Donahoe.

 Plays by acting apprentices and production interns 
2004: As You Like It2005: Twelfth Night2006: Cymbeline2007: Julius Caesar 2008: Pericles2009: Hamlet2010: Titus Andronicus2011: King Lear2012: All's Well that Ends Well2013: Macbeth2014: Troilus and Cressida2015: King John2016: Coriolanus2017: Henry VI2018: The Merchant of Venice2019: Love's Labour's Lost Additionally, the festival featured a performance of Henry V done by their summer class Shakespeare for Young Actors and hosted a performance of The Two Gentlemen of Verona done by the visiting group Shakespearean Youth Theatre.
2021: Romeo and Juliet''

External links
Great River Shakespeare Festival

Shakespeare festivals in the United States
Winona, Minnesota
Festivals in Minnesota
Tourist attractions in Winona County, Minnesota